The 2015 City of Bradford Metropolitan District Council election took place on 7 May 2015. This was on the same day as other local elections and a general election. One councillor was elected in each ward for a four-year term so the councillors elected in 2015 last stood for election in 2011. Each ward is represented by three councillors, the election of which is staggered, so only one third of the councillors were elected in this election. Labour retained overall control of the council.

Election Result
Of the Council's 90 seats, 30 were up for election.

Ward results
The electoral division results listed below are based on the changes from the last time this third was up for election, in the 2011 elections, not taking into account any mid-term by-elections or party defections.

An asterisk denotes an incumbent.

Baildon ward

The incumbent was Rodger L'Amie who retired at the 2015 election.

Bingley ward

Bingley Rural ward

Bolton & Undercliffe ward

The incumbent was Howard Middleton who stood down at the 2015 election.

Bowling & Barkerend ward

Bradford Moor ward

The incumbent was Ghazanfer Khaliq who stood down at the 2015 election.

City ward

The swing is expressed between Labour & Respect.

Clayton & Fairweather Green ward

Craven ward

Eccleshill ward

The incumbent was Ruth Billheimer who retired at this election.

Great Horton ward

The incumbent was John Derek Godward who stood down at this election.

Heaton ward

The incumbent was Rizwan Malik who stood down at this election.
The swing is expressed between Labour & the Conservatives which were second in 2011.

Idle & Thackley ward

There were two candidates elected in the 2011 election and the Liberal Democrats, Labour & Conservatives fielded two candidates each. So the percentage changes & swing for this ward are calculated compared to an average of the votes for the two candidates that represented the corresponding party in 2011.

Ilkley ward

Keighley Central ward

Keighley East ward

Keighley West

The incumbent was Jan Smithies who stepped down at this election.

Little Horton ward

The incumbent was Sher Khan who stood down at this election.

Manningham ward
The incumbent was Asama Javed (Respect) who stood down at this election. The swing is expressed between Labour & Respect.

Queensbury ward
Lisa Carmody resigned early in 2017 forcing a by-election which was won by fellow Conservative Andrew Senior.

Lynda Cromie was elected representing the British National Party in 2011 but left the party in June 2011. The percentage change for Lynda is expressed compared to her showing for the BNP in 2011.

Royds ward

The incumbent was Gill Thornton who stood down at this election.
The swing is expressed between Labour & UKIP.

Shipley ward

Thornton & Allerton ward

Michael Evan McCabe was elected for the Conservative party but in January 2015 he defected to UKIP.
The swing is expressed between the Labour & Conservative showings in 2011 & 2015.

Toller ward

Amir Hussain was elected to represent Labour in 2011 but lost the whip after a picture of him holding a RPG was published & stood as an independent in this election.

Tong ward

The incumbent was John Ruding who stood down at this election. The swing is expressed between Labour & UKIP

Wharfedale ward
The incumbent for the Conservative Party Jackie Whiteley was elected in a by-election 15th November 2012. The by-election was the result of the resignation of Cllr. Matt Palmer who was elected in May 2011.

Wibsey ward

Windhill & Wrose ward

The swing is expressed between Labour & Conservatives though the Conservatives were third to the Liberal Democrats in 2011.

Worth Valley ward

Wyke ward

See also
 Bradford local elections

References

2015 English local elections
May 2015 events in the United Kingdom
2015
2010s in West Yorkshire